Zimbabwe flyafrica.com was a low cost carrier, the first from the flyafrica.com group to start operations. However operations have been suspended since October 2015, on removal of the airline's operating licence, reportedly following shareholder disputes and failure to meet statutory requirements.

History
However, these services reportedly did not commence citing operational logistics issues. It was later advised that the fact the carrier had their aircraft registered in Zimbabwe and their pilots licensed in South Africa prevented scheduled services from being launched, as the CAAZ demanded the pilots to be licensed in the country. Flights eventually commenced in August 2014.

Flights on all routes were suspended in October 2015, after the airline's AOC was withdrawn by the CAAZ. In addition to disputes between the shareholders, there was a failure to meet the regulatory requirements (including that the aircraft were not based in Zimbabwe, and the company did not have an accountable manager and a local head of maintenance) and the airline had not been remitting passenger services charges to CAAZ. The suspension was upheld by the High Court of Zimbabwe in November 2015.

There was a sister carrier Namibia flyafrica (based at Windhoek, Namibia), which was also forced to suspend operations given that it was wet-leasing a B737-500 from Zimbabwe flyafrica for its flights to South Africa. The Namibian Department of Civil Aviation (DCA) suspended the carrier's licence in November 2015 after an investigation showed it had failed to inform the DCA of Zimbabwe flyafrica's AOC revocation while continuing to operate its aircraft.

Corporate affairs

Ownership
The airline is a joint venture between the Zimbabwean infrastructure company Nu.com (previously associated to the Zimbabwean start-up carrier Fresh Air, a project that never materialised) and Flyafrica Ltd, a private aviation group.

Key people
Zimbabwe flyafrica.com CEO was Chakanyuka Karase, but he is no longer an officer of the company.

Destinations
According to its timetable, the carrier served the following destinations , although these have now all been terminated:

Fleet
Flyafrica acquired  ex-Czech Airlines Boeing 737-500 aircraft. , the airline fleet consisted of the following equipment, although only two aircraft were ever registered for use in Zimbabwe:

See also

Transport in Zimbabwe

References

External links

Defunct airlines of Zimbabwe
Airlines established in 2014
Airlines disestablished in 2015
Low-cost carriers